Lejaren Arthur Hiller Jr. (February 23, 1924, New York City – January 26, 1994, Buffalo, New York) was an American composer.

Career

In 1957 he collaborated with Leonard Issacson on his String Quartet No. 4, Illiac Suite, the first significant use of a computer to compose music. In 1958 Hiller founded the Experimental Music Studios at the University of Illinois at Urbana-Champaign. His notable pupils included composers James Fulkerson, Larry Lake, Ilza Nogueira, David Rosenboom, Margaret Scoville, Bernadette Speach and James Tenney. 

He was originally trained as a chemist, and worked as a research chemist for DuPont in Waynesboro, Virginia (1947–52). He developed the first reliable process for dyeing Orlon and coauthored a popular textbook.

He played piano, oboe, clarinet, and saxophone as a child. He also studied composition with Roger Sessions and Milton Babbitt while earning his chemistry degree at Princeton University. His father, Lejaren Hiller, Sr., was a well-known art photographer who specialized in historical tableaux.

He wrote an article on the Illiac Suite for Scientific American which garnered a lot of attention from the press, generating a storm of controversy. The musical establishment was so hostile to this interloper scientist that both Baker's Biographical Dictionary of Musicians and the New Grove Dictionary of Music and Musicians refused to include him until shortly before his death.

A majority of Hiller's works after 1957 do not involve computers at all, but might include stochastic music, indeterminacy, serialism, Brahmsian traditionalism, jazz, performance art, folksong and counterpoint mixed together. He also collaborated with John Cage for HPSCHD.

He created the MUSICOMP ("MUsic SImulator-Interpreter for COMpositional Procedures") programming language for music composition with Robert Baker in order to create their Computer Cantata (1963). In 1968, he joined the faculty at University at Buffalo as Slee Professor of Composition, where he established the school's first computer music facility and co-directed with Lukas Foss at the Center of the Creative and Performing Arts. Illness forced him to retire in 1989.

Death
He died from Alzheimer's disease in 1994 in Buffalo.

Bibliography
Hiller wrote three books:
Hiller, Lejaren A., and Leonard M. Issacson. (1959/1979). Experimental Music: Composition With an Electronic Computer. McGraw-Hill, New York. .
Hiller, Lejaren and Herber, Rolfe H. (1960). Principles of Chemistry.
Hiller, Lejaren (1964). Informationstheorie und Computermusik.

References

Further reading
Bohn, James M. (2004). The Music of American Composer Lejaren Hiller and an Examination of His Early Works Involving Technology (Studies in the History and Interpretation of Music). Edwin Mellen. .

External links
Lejaren Hiller's page at Theodore Presser Company
Lejaren A. Hiller Archive at the University of Buffalo Libraries
A biography about Lejaren A. Hiller

1924 births
1994 deaths
20th-century classical composers
American male classical composers
American classical composers
Musicians from Buffalo, New York
University at Buffalo alumni
Princeton University alumni
University of Illinois Urbana-Champaign faculty
20th-century American chemists
Deaths from dementia in New York (state)
Deaths from Alzheimer's disease
Musicians from New York City
Pupils of Roger Sessions
Experimental Music Studios alumni
20th-century American composers
Scientists from New York (state)
Classical musicians from New York (state)
20th-century American male musicians